Cinyra may refer to:

 Kinnor (also called a "cinyra"), an instrument of ancient Israel
 Cinyra (beetle), a genus of beetle